Victor Henry Grinich (November 26, 1924 – November 5, 2000) was a pioneer in the semiconductor industry and a member of the "traitorous eight" that founded Silicon Valley.

Early life and education
Born to Croatian immigrant parents, his original surname was Grgurinovic. Born in Aberdeen, Washington, he served in the United States Navy during World War II. To make his last name easier to pronounce during military roll calls, he officially changed it to "Grinich".

Grinich received a bachelor's degree from the University of Washington in 1946 and a master's degree in 1949, and then earned a Ph.D. in 1951 from Stanford University.

Career
Initially a researcher at SRI International, he worked at the seminal Shockley Semiconductor Laboratory of Beckman Instruments, and then left with other disgruntled members of the "traitorous eight" to create the influential Fairchild Semiconductor corporation.

Among the physicists, mathematicians and metallurgists in the group, Grinich was the only electrical engineer.

Grinich left Fairchild in 1968 to study computer science while teaching electrical engineering at UC Berkeley. He later taught at Stanford University as well. In 1975, he published a textbook, Introduction to Integrated Circuits.

In 1978, he was appointed chief executive officer of Identronix, a company that pioneered Radio-frequency identification systems, which are now used extensively in anti-theft tags. In 1985, Grinich founded and became CEO of Escort Memory Systems to commercialize RFID tags for industrial applications. EMS was acquired by Datalogic in 1989.

In 1993, he co-founded Arkos Design, a manufacturer of emulators. The company was acquired by Synopsys in 1995. Grinich retired in 1997 and died of prostate cancer in 2000, three weeks before his 76th birthday.

References

1924 births
2000 deaths
American people of Croatian descent
People from Aberdeen, Washington
University of Washington College of Engineering alumni
Stanford University School of Engineering alumni
Silicon Valley people
American computer businesspeople
American electrical engineers
SRI International people
20th-century American businesspeople
Deaths from prostate cancer
Deaths from cancer in California
Scientists at Shockley Semiconductor Laboratory